Raúl Antonio Vidal Moreno (born March 26, 1994, in Salamanca, Guanajuato) is a professional Mexican footballer who currently plays for Tepatitlán de Morelos.

References

External links
 

Living people
1994 births
Mexican footballers
Mexican expatriate footballers
Association football midfielders
Cruz Azul footballers
Santos de Soledad players
Municipal Liberia footballers
C.D. Tepatitlán de Morelos players
Liga MX players
Ascenso MX players
Liga Premier de México players
Liga FPD players
Mexican expatriate sportspeople in Costa Rica
Expatriate footballers in Costa Rica
Footballers from Guanajuato
People from Salamanca, Guanajuato